Kim railway station is a railway station on the Western Railway network in the state of Gujarat, India. Kim railway station is 24 km far away from Surat railway station. Passenger, MEMU and few Express/Superfast trains halt at Kim railway station.

Nearby Stations 

Kudsad is nearest railway station towards Mumbai, whereas  is nearest railway station towards Vadodara.

Major Trains 

Passenger Trains:

 59049/50 Valsad - Viramgam Passenger
 69149/50 Virar - Bharuch MEMU
 59439/40 Mumbai Central - Ahmedabad Passenger
 59441/42 Ahmedabad - Mumbai Central Passenger
 69111/12 Surat - Vadodara MEMU
 69171/72 Surat - Bharuch MEMU
 69109/10 Vadodara - Surat MEMU

Following Express/Superfast trains halt at Kim railway station in both directions:

 19033/34 Valsad - Ahmedabad Gujarat Queen Express
 12929/30 Valsad - Dahod Intercity Superfast Express
 19023/24 Mumbai Central - Firozpur Janata Express
 19215/16 Mumbai Central - Porbandar Saurashtra Express
 22929/30 Bhilad - Vadodara Superfast Express
 22959/60 Surat - Jamnagar Intercity Superfast Express
 22961/62 Surat - Hapa Intercity Weekly Superfast Express
 22953/54 Mumbai Central - Ahmedabad Gujarat Superfast Express

References

See also
 Surat district

Railway stations in Surat district
Vadodara railway division